Stibbard is a village and civil parish in the English county of Norfolk. The nearest railway station is at Sheringham for the Bittern Line which runs between Sheringham, Cromer and Norwich. The nearest airport is Norwich International Airport.

The villages name origin is uncertain. The name exists in a variety of spellings suggesting 'border path', 'stone border' and 'stone bridge'.

For the purposes of local government, it falls within the district of North Norfolk.

Notable people
Arthur Hoare (1871–1941), cricketer and clergyman

References

http://kepn.nottingham.ac.uk/map/place/Norfolk/Stibbard

External links

Stibbard Methodist Church

Villages in Norfolk
Civil parishes in Norfolk
North Norfolk